William Gowland FRAI (16 December 1842 – 9 June 1922) was an English mining engineer who carried out archaeological work at Stonehenge and in Japan. He has been called the "Father of Japanese Archaeology".

Biography
Gowland was born in Sunderland, County Durham, in northern England. He attended the Royal College of Chemistry and Royal School of Mines at South Kensington, specialising in metallurgy, and worked as a chemist and as a metallurgist at the Broughton Copper Company from 1870 to 1872. However, in 1872, at the age of 30, he was recruited by the Meiji government of the Empire of Japan as a foreign engineering advisor at the Osaka Zōheikyoku, the forerunner of the Japan Mint.

In Japan (1872–88)
Gowland began work in Osaka on 8 October 1872 on the three-year contract that was typical of many of the foreigners employed to aid the modernisation of Japan. His contract was repeatedly extended, and he stayed for 16 years, during which time he introduced techniques for the scientific analysis of metals, the production of bronze and copper alloys for coinage, and modern technologies such as the reverberatory furnace for improving the efficiency of refining copper ores. His expertise extended to areas outside the Japan Mint, and he also served as a consultant to the Imperial Japanese Army, helping to establish the Osaka Arsenal for production of artillery.  In 1883, he was awarded the Order of the Rising Sun (4th class) by the Japanese government.

During his spare time in Japan, Gowland enjoyed mountaineering, making the first recorded ascent on several peaks of the Japanese Alps, a name which Gowland coined and which was published in 1888 by Basil Hall Chamberlain in his Japan Guide. The name was later popularised by English missionary Walter Weston. Gowland also claimed to have been the first foreigner to have climbed Yarigatake in 1874.

However, Gowland is best known in Japan as an amateur archaeologist, conducting the first truly accurate scientific surveys of numerous Kofun period (3rd–7th centuries AD) burial mounds (kofun), which included numerous imperial mausolea. He excavated burial mounds in Saga, Fukuoka and Miyazaki Prefectures on Kyūshū, in Okayama Prefecture, and in Fukushima Prefecture north of Tokyo, in addition to numerous sites in the Kinki region.

Upon Gowland's departure from Japan in 1888, he was awarded the Order of the Rising Sun, 4th class, and a 3,000-yen bonus from then-Finance Minister Matsukata Masayoshi. Once back in England, he published numerous works about his researches in Japan and was elected a Fellow of the Royal Society. He donated many of the artefacts that he brought back to England to the British Museum, as well as a collection of souvenirs from Buddhist temples. Gowland was also an avid collector of Nihonga-style Japanese paintings.

In England
On 31 December 1900, Stone 22 of the Sarsen Circle fell over during a storm, taking with it a lintel. Following public pressure and a letter to The Times by William Flinders Petrie, the owner Edmund Antrobus agreed to allow remedial engineering under archaeological supervision. To manage the job, Antrobus appointed Gowland, who, despite having no formal archaeological training, produced some of the finest, most detailed excavation records ever made at the monument. The task proved more difficult since only small areas could be dug at a time for the pouring and the setting of concrete.

Despite these difficulties, he established that antler picks had been used to dig the stone holes and that the stones had been shaped on site. His work both identified the 'Stonehenge layer', a thin stratum of bluestone chips that sealed many of the non-megalithic features at the site, and proved that these chips predated the standing stones.

Final years
Gowland died in London on 9 June 1922 at the age of 79. He was buried at St. Marylebone Cemetery in East Finchley.

Selected works
 The Dolmens and other Antiquities of Korea, 1895
 The Art of Casting Bronze in Japan, 1896
 The Dolmens and Burial Mounds in Japan, 1897
 The Dolmens of Japan and their Builders, 1900
 The Burial Mounds and Dolmens of the Early Emperors of Japan, 1907
 The Art of Working Metals in Japan, 1910
 Metals in Antiquity, 1912
 The Metallurgy of Non-ferrous Metals, 1914
 Metal and Metal-Working in Old Japan, 1915
 Silver in Roman and Earlier Times, 1920

Notes

See also
 Anglo-Japanese relations

References
Chippendale, Christopher. (2983). Stonehenge Complete. London: Thames and Hudson. ;  OCLC 470851552
 Harris, Victor and Kazuo Goto. (2003).  London: British Museum Press. ; ;  OCLC 248880959

External links
Imperial College London

1842 births
1922 deaths
Alumni of Imperial College London
Burials at East Finchley Cemetery
English archaeologists
English expatriates in Japan
English non-fiction writers
Fellows of the Royal Society
Foreign advisors to the government in Meiji-period Japan
Foreign educators in Japan
People from Sunderland
Engineers from Tyne and Wear
Recipients of the Order of the Rising Sun
Fellows of the Royal Anthropological Institute of Great Britain and Ireland
Presidents of the Royal Anthropological Institute of Great Britain and Ireland